Insects vs Robots is a five piece band from Venice, California They employ unusual instruments such as the violin, charango, harp, banjo, kazoo, harmonium, and sitar. They have gained a reputation for having a captivating live performance and diverse sound, created from a large blend of influences.

Albums
The band released their eponymous album in 2013, Tales From The Blue House in 2011, Geryl & The Great Homunculus in 2010, and a self titled EP in 2009.

References

External links
 Official website

American folk musical groups
Progressive rock musical groups from California
Psychedelic rock music groups from California
Musical groups from Los Angeles